A Mars sample-return (MSR) mission is a proposed mission to collect rock and dust samples on Mars and return them to Earth. Such a mission would allow more extensive analysis than that allowed by onboard sensors.

The three most recent concepts are a NASA–ESA proposal, a CNSA proposal, Tianwen-3, and a Roscosmos proposal, Mars-Grunt. Although NASA and ESA's plans to return the samples to Earth are still in the design stage as of 2022, samples have been gathered on Mars by the Perseverance rover.

Risks of cross-contamination of the Earth biosphere from returned Martian samples have been raised, though the risk of this occurring is considered to be extremely low.

Scientific value 

Once returned to Earth, stored samples can be studied with the most sophisticated science instruments available. Thomas Zurbuchen, associate administrator for science at NASA Headquarters in Washington, expect such studies to allow several new discoveries at many fields. Samples may be reanalyzed in the future by instruments that do not yet exist.

In 2006, the Mars Exploration Program Analysis Group identified 55 important investigations related to Mars exploration. In 2008, they concluded that about half of the investigations "could be addressed to one degree or another by MSR", making MSR "the single mission that would make the most progress towards the entire list" of investigations. Moreover, it was reported that a significant fraction of the investigations could not be meaningfully advanced without returned samples.

One source of Mars samples is what are thought to be Martian meteorites, which are rocks ejected from Mars that made their way to Earth. As of April 2019, 266 meteorites had been identified as Martian, out of over 61,000 known meteorites. These meteorites are believed to be from Mars because their elemental and isotopic compositions are similar to rocks and atmospheric gases analyzed on Mars.

History 

For at least three decades, scientists have advocated the return of geological samples from Mars. One early concept was the Sample Collection for Investigation of Mars (SCIM) proposal, which involved sending a spacecraft in a grazing pass through Mars's upper atmosphere to collect dust and air samples without landing or orbiting.

The Soviet Union considered a Mars sample-return mission, Mars 5NM, in 1975 but it was cancelled due to the repeated failures of the N1 rocket that would have launched it. Another sample-return mission, Mars 5M (Mars-79), planned for 1979, was cancelled due to complexity and technical problems.

In the late 1980s, multiple NASA centers contributed to a proposed Mars Rover Sample Return mission (MRSR).  As described by JPL authors, one option for MRSR relied on a single launch of a 12-ton package including a Mars orbiter and Earth return vehicle, a 700-kg rover, and a 2.7-ton Mars ascent vehicle which would use pump-fed liquid propulsion for a significant mass saving. A 20-kg sample package on the MAV was to contain 5 kg of Mars soil. A Johnson Space Center author subsequently referred to a launch from Earth in 1998 with a MAV mass in the range 1400 to 1500 kg including a pump-fed first stage and a pressure-fed second stage.

The United States' Mars Exploration Program, formed after Mars Observer failure in September 1993, supported a Mars sample return. One architecture was proposed by Glenn J. MacPherson in the early 2000s.

In 1996, the possibility of life on Mars was raised when apparent microfossils were thought to have been found in Mars meteorite, ALH84001. This hypothesis was eventually rejected, but led to a renewed interest in a Mars sample return.

As of late 1999, the MSR mission was anticipated to be launched from Earth in 2003 and 2005. Each was to deliver a rover and a Mars ascent vehicle, and a French supplied Mars orbiter with Earth return capability was to be included in 2005.  Sample containers orbited by both MAVs were to reach Earth in 2008. This mission concept, considered by NASA's Mars Exploration Program to return samples by 2008, was cancelled following a program review.

In mid-2006, the International Mars Architecture for the Return of Samples (iMARS) Working Group was chartered by the International Mars Exploration Working Group (IMEWG) to outline the scientific and engineering requirements of an internationally sponsored and executed Mars sample-return mission in the 2018–2023 time frame.

In October 2009, NASA and ESA established the Mars Exploration Joint Initiative to proceed with the ExoMars program, whose ultimate aim is "the return of samples from Mars in the 2020s". ExoMars's first mission was planned to launch in 2018  with unspecified missions to return samples in the 2020–2022 time frame. The cancellation of the caching rover MAX-C in 2011, and later NASA withdrawal from ExoMars, due to budget limitations, ended the mission. The pull-out was described as "traumatic" for the science community.

In early 2011, the US National Research Council's Planetary Science Decadal Survey, which laid out mission planning priorities for the period 2013–2022, declared an MSR campaign its highest priority Flagship Mission for that period. In particular, it endorsed the proposed Mars Astrobiology Explorer-Cacher (MAX-C) mission in a "descoped" (less ambitious) form. This mission plan was officially cancelled in April 2011.

A key mission requirement for the Mars 2020 Perseverance rover mission was that it help prepare for MSR. The rover landed on 18 February 2021 in Jezero Crater to collect samples and store them in 43 cylindrical tubes for later retrieval.

Mars 2020 mission 

The Mars 2020 mission landed the Perseverance rover in Jezero crater in February 2021. It has collected multiple and is going to further more samples and packing them into cylinders for later return in the MSR Campaign. Jezero appears to be an ancient lakebed, suitable for ground sampling. It is also assigned the task to return the samples directly to the Sample Return lander, considering its potential mission longetivity. 

From December 21, 2022, Perseverance started a campaign to deposit 10 of its collected samples to the backup depot, Three Forks to ensure if Perseverance runs into problems, the MSR campaign could still succeed.

Proposals

NASA–ESA 

The NASA-ESA plan is to return samples using three missions: a sample collection mission (Perseverance) launched in 2020 and currently operational, a sample retrieval mission (Sample Retrieval Lander + Mars ascent vehicle +  Sample Transfer arm + 2 Ingenuity class helicopters) launched in 2026 or 2028, and a return mission (Earth Return Orbiter) in 2026. The mission hopes to resolve the question of whether Mars once harbored life.

China 
China has announced plans for a Mars sample-return mission to be called Tianwen-3. The mission would launch in late 2028, with a lander and ascent vehicle on a Long March 5 and an orbiter and return module launched separately on a Long March 3B. Samples would be returned to Earth in July 2031.

A previous plan would have used a large spacecraft that could carry out all mission phases, including sample collection, ascent, orbital rendezvous, and return flight. This would have required the super-heavy-lift Long March 9 launch vehicle. Another plan involved using Tianwen-1 to cache the samples for retrieval.

France 
France has worked towards a sample return for many years. This included concepts of an extraterrestrial sample curation facility for returned samples, and numerous proposals. They worked on the development of a Mars sample-return orbiter, which would capture and return the samples as part of a joint mission with other countries.

Japan 
On 9 June 2015, the Japanese Aerospace Exploration Agency (JAXA) unveiled a plan named Martian Moons Exploration (MMX) to retrieve samples from Phobos or Deimos. Phobos's orbit is closer to Mars and its surface may have captured particles blasted from Mars. The launch from Earth is planned for September 2024, with a return to Earth in 2029. Japan has also shown interest in participating in an international Mars sample-return mission.

Russia 

A Russian Mars sample-return mission concept is Mars-Grunt. It adopted Fobos-Grunt design heritage. 2011 plans envisioned a two-stage architecture with an orbiter and a lander (but no roving capability), with samples gathered from around the lander by a robotic arm.

Back contamination 

Whether life forms exist on Mars is unresolved. Thus, MSR could potentially transfer viable organisms to Earth, resulting in back contamination — the introduction of extraterrestrial organisms into Earth's biosphere. The scientific consensus is that the potential for large-scale effects, either through pathogenesis or ecological disruption, is small. Returned samples would be treated as potentially biohazardous until scientists decide the samples are safe. The goal is that the probability of release of a Mars particle is less than one in a million.

The proposed NASA Mars sample-return mission will not be approved by NASA until the National Environmental Policy Act (NEPA) process has been completed. Furthermore, under the terms of Article VII of the Outer Space Treaty and other legal frameworks, were a release of organisms to occur, the releasing nation(s) would be liable for any resultant damages.

The sample-return mission would be tasked with preventing contact between the Martian environment and the exterior of the sample containers.

In order to eliminate the risk of parachute failure, the current plan is to use the thermal protection system to cushion the capsule upon impact (at terminal velocity). The sample container would be designed to withstand the force of impact. To receive the returned samples, NASA proposed a custom Biosafety Level 4 containment facility, the Mars Sample-Return Receiving facility (MSRRF).

Other scientists and engineers, notably Robert Zubrin of the Mars Society, argued in the Journal of Cosmology that contamination risk is functionally zero leaving little need to worry. They cite, among other things, lack of any known incident although trillions of kilograms of material have been exchanged between Mars and Earth via meteorite impacts.

The International Committee Against Mars Sample Return (ICAMSR) is an advocacy group led by Barry DiGregorio, that campaigns against a Mars sample-return mission. While ICAMSR acknowledges a low probability for biohazards, it considers the proposed containment measures to be unsafe. ICAMSR advocates more in situ studies on Mars, and preliminary biohazard testing at the International Space Station before the samples are brought to Earth. DiGregorio accepts the conspiracy theory of a NASA coverup regarding the discovery of microbial life by the 1976 Viking landers. DiGregorio also supports a view that several pathogens – such as common viruses – originate in space and probably caused some mass extinctions and pandemics. These claims connecting terrestrial disease and extraterrestrial pathogens have been rejected by the scientific community.

See also 

 Timeline of Solar System exploration

References

External links 
 Mars Sample return media reel produced by NASA and JPL (video)

Chinese space probes
European Space Agency space probes
Missions to Mars
Proposed astrobiology space missions
Proposed NASA space probes